This is the Cabinet of Uttarakhand headed by the Chief Minister of Uttarakhand, B. C. Khanduri from 2011–2012.

Council of Ministers

Here is the list of ministers.

 Cabinet Ministers:
 Matbar Singh Kandari - Irrigation, Minor Irrigation, Flood Control, Food & Civil Supplies, Social Welfare & Handicapped Welfare
 Trivendra Singh Rawat - Agriculture, Agricultural Education, Agricultural Marketing, Fruit industry, Animal Husbandry, Milk Development, Fisheries
 Bishan Singh Chuphal
 Madan Kaushik - Excise, Sugarcane Development, Sugar Mill Industries, Tourism
 Prakash Pant - Parliamentary Affairs, Legislatures, Drinking Water, Labour, Re-organisation, Election, External Planning  
 Diwakar Bhatt - Food & Civil Supplies, Urban Development, Urban Employment, Poverty Alleviation
 Rajendra Singh Bhandari - Panchayati Raj, Alternative Energy, Census, Civil Defense and Home Guard, Jail

 Ministers of State (Independent Charge):
 Vijaya Barthwal - Rural Development, Women Welfare & Child Development
 Govind Singh Bisht

 Ministers of State:
 Khajan Das - Disaster Management, Social Welfare
 Balwant Singh Bhauryal - Health & Family Welfare, Information Technology

References

Uttarakhand ministries
2011 establishments in Uttarakhand
Cabinets established in 2011
Cabinets disestablished in 2012
2012 disestablishments in India
Bharatiya Janata Party state ministries